Kemal Faruki (27 August 1910 – 27 January 1988) was a Turkish professional footballer. He spent the entirety of his career with his hometown club, Galatasaray SK. He also represented Turkey on two occasions. He was part of Turkey's squad at the 1928 Summer Olympics, but he did not play in any matches.

Career

Kemal Faruki was born in Istanbul, Turkey, and played his entire career as a forward and midfielder for Galatasaray SK.
Faruki was selected to Galatasaray's A team when he was 17. Faruki won the Istanbul Football League five times.

He made his senior national team debut against Bulgaria on 17 July 1927. In his first international match he scored his first goal. He died in Cairo, Egypt, aged 77.

Career statistics

International goals

Honours

As player
Galatasaray
Istanbul Football League: 1924–25, 1925–26, 1926–27, 1928–29, 1930–31
 Istanbul Kupası: 1933

See also
List of one-club men

References

1910 births
1988 deaths
Turkish footballers
Turkey international footballers
Galatasaray S.K. footballers
Footballers from Istanbul
Galatasaray High School alumni
Footballers at the 1924 Summer Olympics
Footballers at the 1928 Summer Olympics
Olympic footballers of Turkey
Association football forwards